Gianfranco Cunico (born 11 October 1957 in Vicenza) is an Italian rally driver who won the 1993 Rallye Sanremo.

Career
Cunico scored his first points in the World Rally Championship on the 1989 Tour de Corse when he finished seventh, driving for Ford. In 1991 he scored his first podium by finishing third on the Tour de Corse. On the 1993 Rallye Sanremo he took a surprise win as a privateer driver.

He won the Italian Rally Championship in 1994, 1995 and 1996. In 2000 and 2001 he won the Italian Gravel title.

WRC victories
{|class="wikitable"
! # 
!Event
!Season
!Co-driver
!Car
|-
|1
| 35º Rallye Sanremo - Rallye d'Italia
|1993
|Stefano Evangelisti
|Ford Escort RS Cosworth
|}

References

External links
 Official website 
 Profile at RallyBase
 Profile at World Rally Archive
 Profile at eWRC-results.com

Living people
Sportspeople from Vicenza
1957 births
Italian rally drivers
World Rally Championship drivers
Intercontinental Rally Challenge drivers